Night of the Living Doo is an American animated television special that aired on Cartoon Network on October 31, 2001. The cartoon is a comedic parody of a typical episode of The New Scooby-Doo Movies, complete with unlikely guests and a retro style. Its title is a riff on the Night of the Living Dead franchise. The animation was produced by Cartoon Network and broadcast in small segments during commercial breaks of a Halloween Scooby-Doo marathon. At the end of the marathon, the complete special was broadcast in its entirety and was available on the Adult Swim website for a brief period. It has not been released on home video.

The special features a new opening title sequence combining the opening for The New Scooby-Doo Movies with clips of the special, set to the cover of the Scooby-Doo, Where Are You! theme song as performed by Matthew Sweet for Saturday Morning: Cartoons' Greatest Hits. It was nominated for an Annie Award.

Plot
Scooby-Doo and the Mystery Inc. gang pick up a hitchhiking Gary Coleman, and the Mystery Machine soon proceeds to break down multiple times, finally leaving them stranded at a haunted castle owned by David Cross. The show contained multiple references and gags that take jabs at the original show, musical numbers by Big Bad Voodoo Daddy, and concluded with a nonsensical ending, with Coleman pointing out all of the plot holes in the story. Scooby interrupts him by licking his face until the episode ends.

Cast
 Frank Welker as Fred Jones and Jabberjaw/Zombie
 B.J. Ward as Velma Dinkley
 Grey DeLisle as Daphne Blake
 Scott Innes as Shaggy Rogers and Scooby-Doo
 Mark Hamill as Himself/Mr. Shifty/Zombie
 Gary Coleman as Himself
 David Cross as Himself
Big Bad Voodoo Daddy as Themselves

Reception
Mark Pellegrini of AiPT! enjoyed the special and felt that it did not veer too far into various content as it could have.

Accolades

References

External links

 
 Night of the Living Doo on Metacritic

Scooby-Doo specials
Animated crossover television specials
2000s animated television specials
2001 television specials
Parodies of Scooby-Doo
Parodies of horror
2000s American television specials